Blasio may refer to:

Blasio Vincent Ndale Esau Oriedo (1931–1966), Kenyan doctor
José Luis Blasio (1842–1923), Mexican secretary
Bill de Blasio (born 1961), Mayor of New York City

See also

De Blasio (surname)
Raúl Di Blasio (born 1949), Argentine pianist